Fatos Daja (born 11 January 1968, in Albania) is a former Albanian football defender.  He earned 6 caps for the Albania national team during 1991 to 1997.

International career
He made his debut for Albania in a May 1991 European Championship qualification match in Tirana against Czechoslovakia and earned a total of 6 caps, scoring no goals. His final international was a March 1997 FIFA World Cup qualification match against Ukraine.

Managerial career
Daja was coach of then-Maltese First Division side Balzan Youths in the 2002-03 season.

References

1968 births
Living people
Association football defenders
Albanian footballers
Albania international footballers
KF Tirana players
St. Patrick F.C. players
Ħamrun Spartans F.C. players
Qormi F.C. players
Albanian expatriate footballers
Expatriate footballers in Malta
Albanian expatriate sportspeople in Malta
Balzan F.C. managers
Albanian expatriate football managers
Expatriate football managers in Malta